Stones is an album recorded in Italy by the group Alfabeats Nu Jazz. The album was released in the United States on the Oasis label in 2006 and distributed by JMood Records.

Reception

The All About Jazz review by John Kelman awarded the album 4½ stars and simply states: "Alfabeats is a playing band, albeit one with a language that extends far beyond the conventional definition of jazz to include elements of soul, R&B, funk... even hints of progressive rock and classic '70s Brit-rock. Regardless of how the group amalgamates a seemingly disparate group of influences, groove is priority number one. Stones is an exciting debut that will no doubt appeal to a younger demographic. But it's just as certain to attract more seasoned jazzers who don't have a knee-jerk reaction against rap or the idea of straying away from convention."

Track listing
All tracks are written by Max "Mbassado" Marzio and Roberto Magris, except where noted.
 "Syeeda's Flute in Wonderland" – 6:04 
 "Stones" – 6:27 
 "Islamic Spires" – 5:06 
 "Red Cap & the Bad Loop" – 6:30 
 "L.A.P.D." (Marzio, Paolo Andriolo, Luca Boscagin) – 2:53 
 "Terra Nuda" – 2:27 
 "Reaching the Holy Land" (Magris) – 4:55
 "Get Coltranized" – 4:52
 "Floppy Generation Blues" – 4:02

Personnel
Alfabeats Nu Jazz
Max "Mbassado" Marzio – vocals, rap
Luca Boscagin – electric guitar
Roberto Magris – piano, electric piano, Hammond organ
Paolo Andriolo – electric bass
Paolo Prizzon – drums and percussion

Production
 Roberto Magris – producer
 Paul Collins – executive producer
 Fulvio Zafret – engineering

References

2006 albums
Roberto Magris albums